The Battle of Sarus was a battle fought in April 625 between the Byzantine army, led by Emperor Heraclius, and the Persian general Shahrbaraz. After a series of maneuvers, the Byzantine army under Heraclius, which in the previous year had invaded Persia, caught up with Shahrbaraz's army, which was heading towards the Byzantine capital, Constantinople, where his forces would take part in its siege together with the Avars. The battle ended in a nominal victory for the Byzantines, but Shahrbaraz withdrew in good order, and was able to continue his advance through Anatolia towards Constantinople.

References

Sources 

Sarus 625
Sarus
Sarus
620s in the Byzantine Empire
625